The Knights of Columbus Building is a historic building located at Gary, Indiana.  It was built in 1925, and is a ten-story brick building that has served as a hotel, a clubhouse, a restaurant, and a sport facility.

It was listed on the National Register of Historic Places in 1984.

See also
 Knights of Columbus Building (South Bend, Indiana)
 List of Knights of Columbus buildings

References

External links

Preserve Indiana's photos of the KofC building.
More photos of the building on Flickr.

Commercial buildings on the National Register of Historic Places in Indiana
Knights of Columbus buildings in the United States
National Register of Historic Places in Gary, Indiana
Buildings and structures completed in 1925
Clubhouses on the National Register of Historic Places in Indiana